Mehdi Çoba (born 9 March 2000) is an Albanian footballer who plays as a forward for Vllaznia in the Kategoria Superiore.

Career

Early career
In September 2019, Çoba traveled to Azerbaijan to train with Sabah FC. He signed an 18-month contract with the club in January 2020, joining the club's youth team.

Vllaznia
In August 2020, Çoba returned to his native Albania, signing with Kategoria Superiore club Vllaznia. He made his league debut for the club on 29 November 2020, coming on as a 74th-minute substitute for Ismael Dunga in a 4–2 home defeat to Kukësi. in February 2022, he signed a three-year contract extension with the club.

Career statistics

Club

References

External links
Mehdi Çoba at SofaScore

2000 births
Living people
Albanian expatriate footballers
Association football forwards
Footballers from Shkodër
Albanian footballers
KF Vllaznia Shkodër players
Kategoria Superiore players
Albanian expatriate sportspeople in Azerbaijan
Expatriate footballers in Azerbaijan